Alfredo Borelli (18 November 1858, in Marseilles – 6 May 1943, in Boves, Piedmont) was a French-born Italian zoologist, who worked mainly in Turin but who, early in his natural history career, conducted field work in South America. 

Borelli graduated in law from Aix University in 1888 and practised as a lawyer in Marseilles for a while before deciding to follow his interest in the natural sciences, going to his family's home country of Italy and graduating from the University of Turin in 1886. He worked in Munich and Berlin but most of his scientific career was spent at the  institute of zoology of the University of Turin, from where he retired in 1930.

He worked at the Museo Regionale di Scienze Naturali di Torino from 1900 to 1913. The gecko Homonota borellii, the amphisbaenian Amphisbaena borelli, the millipede Urostreptus borellii (Silvestri, 1895)
and the cichlid Apistogramma borellii are among the taxa named in honor of Borelli. He carried out field work in  Bolivia, Argentina, and Paraguay where he collected specimens, and many of his specimens were described by Mario Giacinto Peracca.

References

Italian zoologists
1858 births
1943 deaths